The president of the University of Illinois System, a system of public universities in Illinois, is the chief executive officer and a member of the faculty of each of its colleges, schools, institutes, and divisions. The president is elected by the University of Illinois Board of Trustees and is responsible to them for the operation of the system. The president prepares budgets for presentation to the board, recommends persons to the board for appointment to university positions, and is responsible for the enforcement of the rules and regulations of the universities. On recommendation of each university and by authority of the trustees, the president issues diplomas conferring degrees. Following the establishment of the office in 1867, John Milton Gregory served as the first president, and there have been 20 presidents in total. The current president is Timothy L. Killeen, who has held the position 

On March 12, 1867, during the first meeting of the Board of Trustees of Illinois Industrial University, the trustees established the office of the president. The original charter designated the chief executive officer of the university as "Regent" but this title was changed to "President" in 1894 following the end of Thomas Jonathan Burrill's term.

Up until 1967, the president also served as the principal administrator of the original Urbana-Champaign campus. In June 1966, at the recommendation of president David D. Henry, the board switched to a chancellorship system of administration. The change established a new administrative office, the "Chancellor of the University of Illinois Urbana Champaign", and renamed the two administrators of the Chicago campuses, vice president of the University of Illinois at the Medical Center and vice president of the University of Illinois at Chicago Circle, to chancellor. The two Chicago campuses were later consolidated in 1982 to form the University of Illinois at Chicago. The chancellors of each campus are appointed by the board following nomination by the president and perform duties that are assigned by the president.

List of presidents

Timeline of presidencies

See also
 List of chancellors of the University of Illinois Chicago
 List of chancellors of the University of Illinois Springfield
 List of chancellors of the University of Illinois Urbana-Champaign

Notes

References

 
Illinois, University of, system
Illinois, University of, system
University of Illinois System